"Black Chandelier" is a song by Scottish alternative rock band Biffy Clyro. The track was first released in the United Kingdom on 14 January 2013 as the lead single from the band's sixth studio album, Opposites (2013). The track received its first play on 19 November 2012, having been selected as BBC Radio 1 DJ Zane Lowe's Hottest Record in the World.

Track listing

Charts

Certifications

Release history

References

Biffy Clyro songs
2013 songs
14th Floor Records singles
2013 singles
Songs written by Simon Neil
Song recordings produced by Garth Richardson